The 2018 Southern Jaguars football team represented Southern University in the 2018 NCAA Division I FCS football season. The Jaguars were led by sixth-year head coach Dawson Odums and played their home games at Ace W. Mumford Stadium in Baton Rouge, Louisiana as members of the West Division of the Southwestern Athletic Conference (SWAC).

Previous season
The Jaguars finished the 2017 season 7–4, 5–2 in SWAC play to finish in second place in the West Division.

Preseason

SWAC football media day
During the SWAC football media day held in Birmingham, Alabama on July 13, 2018, the Jaguars were predicted to finish second in the West Division.

Media poll

Presason All-SWAC Team
The Jaguars had two players at four positions selected to Preseason All-SWAC Teams.

Offense
1st team

Jerimiah Abby – Jr. OL

Defense
1st team

Andrea Augustine – Sr. DB

Roster

Schedule

Source: Schedule

Game summaries

at TCU

at Louisiana Tech

Langston

 This game was called late in the 3rd quarter due to lightning with Southern declared the winner.

vs Alabama A&M

Alcorn State

at Prairie View A&M

vs. Texas Southern

Jackson State

Arkansas–Pine Bluff

vs Grambling State

at Alcorn State (SWAC Championship Game)

References

Southern
Southern Jaguars football seasons
Southern Jaguars football